Ravnefjeldet (Raven Mountain) (308 metres), also known as Quassik is a mountain close to Nanortalik in the tip of southern Greenland

Mountains of Greenland